The Military ranks of the Democratic Republic of Congo are the military insignia used by the Armed Forces of the Democratic Republic of the Congo.

Commissioned officer ranks
The rank insignia of commissioned officers.

Other ranks
The rank insignia of non-commissioned officers and enlisted personnel.

See also
 Military ranks of Zaire

References

External links
 
 

Democratic Republic of the Congo
Military of the Democratic Republic of the Congo